Arctosippa is a monotypic genus of spiders in the family Lycosidae. It was first described by Roewer in 1960. , it contains only one species, Arctosippa gracilis, found in Peru.

References

Lycosidae
Monotypic Araneomorphae genera
Spiders of South America
Taxa named by Carl Friedrich Roewer